Mizanur Rahman Sinha is a Bangladesh Nationalist Party politician, a former Jatiya Sangsad member representing the Munshiganj-2 constituency, and the managing director of The ACME Laboratories Ltd.

Early life
Sinha completed his M.A. from the University of Dhaka.

Career
Sinha became the managing director of The ACME Laboratories Ltd on 30 September 1995. He is the chairman of Sinha Knit and Denims Ltd, Sinha Knit Industries Ltd, Sinha Fabrics Limited, and the Sinha Wool Wears Limited. He was elected to Parliament in 1996 and in 2001 from Munshiganj-2 as a candidate of Bangladesh Nationalist Party. He served as the State Minister of Health and Family welfare. He also served as the State Minister of Textiles. On 1 April 2016 he was made treasurer of Bangladesh Nationalist Party.

References

Living people
University of Dhaka alumni
Bangladeshi businesspeople
Bangladesh Nationalist Party politicians
7th Jatiya Sangsad members
8th Jatiya Sangsad members
State Ministers of Health and Family Welfare (Bangladesh)
Year of birth missing (living people)